Baton Rouge station is a historic train station located at 100 South River Road in downtown Baton Rouge, Louisiana. It was built for the Yazoo and Mississippi Valley Railroad which got absorbed by the Illinois Central Railroad. The station was a stop on the Y&MV main line between Memphis, Tennessee and New Orleans, Louisiana. The building now houses the Louisiana Art and Science Museum.

The two-story main block and the two one-story wings in Classical Revival style stand directly across the Old State Capitol building.

The building was added to the National Register of Historic Places on May 19, 1994, as the Yazoo and Mississippi Valley Railroad Co. Depot.

IC-333, a 0-6-0 steam engine formerly owned by the Charles Black Sand & Gravel Company of Fluker, LA, is on display just outside the building. Several passenger cars previously on display have been removed. As of 2011, IC-333 and its tender have been removed from the site as well.

Passenger service
In 1949 passenger service consisted of the Illinois Central's Planter, an all-coach train from Memphis, Tennessee to New Orleans via Vicksburg, Mississippi (along the Yazoo (main line, rather than the IC main line). The station hosted an additional two trains to and two trains from New Orleans.

In the station's final years of use, it was not used by the Illinois Central but instead by the Missouri Pacific, the unnamed successor to the Houstonian night train on the Houston - New Orleans route. This was not the final train in the city; the Kansas City Southern Railway continued the Southern Belle until 1969 at that company's own station in Baton Rouge.

Louisiana Art and Science Museum 
The museum contains many exhibits and galleries, as well as a planetarium.

 An ancient Egyptian mummy from the Ptolemaic dynasty.
 A gallery for the solar system, including displays on astronomy and meteors. In 2018, the museum was also loaned a Triceratops skull from a private collection, nicknamed Jason.
 Louisiana's Apollo 11 lunar sample display in its stores.

See also
Yazoo and Mississippi Valley Railroad
National Register of Historic Places listings in East Baton Rouge Parish, Louisiana
Delta Blues Museum (former Yazoo and Mississippi Valley Railroad Co. Depot) in Clarksdale, Mississippi

Footnotes

External links 
 Louisiana Art and Science Museum 

Yazoo and Mississippi Valley Railroad
Railway stations on the National Register of Historic Places in Louisiana
Neoclassical architecture in Louisiana
Former Illinois Central Railroad stations
Museums in Baton Rouge, Louisiana
National Register of Historic Places in Baton Rouge, Louisiana
Railway stations in the United States opened in 1925
1925 establishments in Louisiana
Former railway stations in Louisiana

Louisiana_Art_and_Science_Museum